The abbreviation cf. Style guides recommend that cf. be used only to suggest a comparison, and the word "see" be used to point to a source of information.

Biological use

In biological naming conventions, cf. is commonly placed between the genus name and the species name to describe a specimen that is hard to identify because of practical difficulties, such as poor preservation. For example, " cf. " indicates that the specimen is in the genus Barbus and believed to be , but the actual species-level identification cannot be certain.

Cf. can also be used to express a possible identity, or at least a significant resemblance, such as between a newly observed specimen and a known species or taxon. Such a usage might suggest a specimen's membership of the same genus or possibly of a shared higher taxon. For example, in the note ", cf. ", the author is confident of the order and family (Diptera: Tabanidae) but can only suggest the genus (Tabanus) and has no information favouring a particular species.

Numismatic use
Among numismatists (coin collector-research specialists), cf. may be used in references on the paper and/or online coin identification information meaning compare to.  It is common for abbreviations of listings in trusted coin catalogues or sales from certain online auctions to be cited when identifying a particular coin.  If the specimen is question is not an exact match but comes close to a known source, cf. may be used.

See also 
 Aff.
 Citation signal
 List of Latin abbreviations
 Viz.

References

External links 
 

Abbreviations
Latin words and phrases